This is the list of the railway stations in Campania owned by Rete Ferroviaria Italiana, a branch of the Italian state company Ferrovie dello Stato.

List

Other stations
Not owned by FS
Napoli Porta Nolana railway station (owned by SFSM)

See also

Railway stations in Italy
Ferrovie dello Stato
Rail transport in Italy
High-speed rail in Italy
Transport in Italy

References

External links

 
Campania